Marek Rutkiewicz (born 8 May 1981 in Olsztyn) is a Polish former road racing cyclist, who rode professionally between 2001 and 2020 for seven different teams. Rutkiewicz's strength was in climbing and his victories came in hilly races, including the mountains classification at the 2009 Tour de Pologne. He now works as a directeur sportif for UCI Continental team .

Personal life
Rutkiewicz is married to fellow cyclist Anna Szafraniec.

Major results

2002
 1st Stage 4 Tour de l'Ain
 3rd Overall Tour de Pologne
2003
 2nd Grand Prix de Wallonie
 5th Overall Tour de Pologne
 7th Overall Tour de l'Ain
 8th Japan Cup
2004
 2nd Coupe des Carpathes
 4th Overall Tour de Pologne
1st Stage 6
2005
 3rd Pomorski Klasyk
 5th Overall Sachsen Tour
 6th Overall Tour of Małopolska
 8th Overall Tour de Pologne
2006
 1st Overall Tour of Małopolska
1st Stage 2
 4th Overall Tour de Pologne
 5th Grote Prijs Stad Zottegem
2007
 10th Overall Danmark Rundt
2008
 1st Stage 3 Tour of Małopolska
 2nd Overall Tour of Qinghai Lake
1st Stage 5
 4th Coupe des Carpathes
 6th Overall Course de Solidarność et des Champions Olympiques
1st Mountains classification
 10th Overall Tour de Pologne
2009
 6th Overall Tour de Pologne
1st  Mountains classification
2010
 1st  National Hill Climb Championships
 1st Overall Szlakiem Grodów Piastowskich
1st Stage 1
 1st Coupe des Carpathes
 3rd Memoriał Henryka Łasaka
 7th Overall Tour de Pologne
2011
 2nd Overall Szlakiem Grodów Piastowskich
1st Stage 4
 2nd Overall Tour of Małopolska
1st Stage 2
 2nd Coupe des Carpathes
 9th Overall Giro di Padania
 10th Overall Tour de Pologne
2012
 1st Overall Circuit des Ardennes
 1st Overall Szlakiem Grodów Piastowskich
1st Points classification
1st Stage 2 (ITT)
 1st Overall Tour of Małopolska
1st Points classification
1st Stage 3
 4th Puchar Ministra Obrony Narodowej
 6th Coupe des Carpathes
 7th Memoriał Henryka Łasaka
2013
 4th Overall Szlakiem Grodów Piastowskich
2014
 2nd Overall Szlakiem Grodów Piastowskich
1st Points classification
 6th Memoriał Henryka Łasaka
2015
 9th Overall Tour of Croatia
2016
 1st Visegrad 4 Bicycle Race – GP Czech Republic
 2nd Road race, National Road Championships
 2nd Memoriał Romana Siemińskiego
 2nd Visegrad 4 Bicycle Race – GP Poland
 2nd Race Horizon Park Classic
 4th Overall Tour of Małopolska
1st Mountains classification
1st Stage 3
 5th Horizon Park Race for Peace
 6th Overall Szlakiem Grodów Piastowskich
2017
 1st Overall Szlakiem Grodów Piastowskich
1st Points classification
1st Stage 2
 1st Overall Bałtyk–Karkonosze Tour
 2nd Road race, National Road Championships
 3rd Coupe des Carpathes
 4th Overall Tour of Małopolska
 5th Overall Szlakiem Walk Majora Hubala
1st Mountains classification
 5th Visegrad 4 Bicycle Race – GP Slovakia
 7th Memoriał Andrzeja Trochanowskiego
 9th Puchar Ministra Obrony Narodowej
2018
 2nd Grand Prix Doliny Baryczy Milicz
 2nd Grand Prix Minsk
 3rd Memorial Grundmanna I Wizowskiego
 6th Overall Course de Solidarność et des Champions Olympiques
 9th Overall Tour of Małopolska
 9th Visegrad 4 Bicycle Race – GP Slovakia
2019
 4th Overall Szlakiem Grodów Piastowskich
1st Mountains classification
 4th Memorial Grundmanna I Wizowskiego
2020
 5th Overall Belgrade–Banja Luka

References

External links

1981 births
Living people
Polish male cyclists
Sportspeople from Olsztyn